Interstate 480 may refer to:
Interstate 480 (Nebraska–Iowa), a loop through Omaha, Nebraska into Council Bluffs, Iowa
Interstate 480 (Ohio), a loop through Cleveland, Ohio
Interstate 480 (California), the former Embarcadero Freeway in San Francisco, California
Interstate 476, designated as Interstate 480 back when I-76 was I-80S

80-4
4